Great Planes Model Manufacturing Company of Champaign, Illinois, United States, was a radio-controlled model manufacturer and distributor and a part of Hobbico, Incorporated.

Radio-controlled aircraft
Companies based in Champaign County, Illinois
Champaign, Illinois